Televicentro may refer to the following:
Televicentro 4, former name of WAPA-TV, a television station in Puerto Rico
Televicentro (Honduras), a television station in Honduras
Televicentro (Canal 2), a television station in Nicaragua
Televicentro, a former name of Televisa Mexico